Antron is a male given name and may refer to:

Given name
Antron Brown (born 1976), American drag racer
Antron Dillon (born 1985), American football player
Antron Singleton, birth name of Big Lurch (born 1976), American rapper

Middle name
Byron Antron Leftwich, full name of Byron Leftwich (born 1980), American gridiron football player
Dominick Antron Wickliffe, full name of Crooked I (born 1976), American rapper
Joshua Antron Chapman, full name of Josh Chapman (born 1989), American gridiron football player
Killian Deron Antron Hayes, full name of Killian Hayes (born 2001), French-American basketball player

See also

Anthon (given name)
Antoon
Antxon, name
Carmelo Antrone Lee